
Gmina Oborniki Śląskie is an urban-rural gmina (administrative district) in Trzebnica County, Lower Silesian Voivodeship, in south-western Poland.

It is part of the larger Wrocław metropolitan area.

Neighbouring gminas
Gmina Oborniki Śląskie is bordered by the town of Wrocław and the gminas of Brzeg Dolny, Miękinia, Prusice, Trzebnica, Wisznia Mała and Wołów.

Villages
Apart from the town of Oborniki Śląskie, the gmina contains the villages of Bagno, Borkowice, Brzeźno Małe, Golędzinów, Jary, Kotowice, Kowale, Kuraszków, Lubnów, Morzęcin Mały, Morzęcin Wielki, Niziny, Nowosielce, Osola, Osolin, Paniowice, Pęgów, Piekary, Przecławice, Raków, Rościsławice, Siemianice, Uraz, Wielka Lipa, Wilczyn Leśny and Zajączków.

References

Oborniki Slaskie
Trzebnica County